The Queensland Government is the democratic administrative authority of the Australian state of Queensland. The Government of Queensland, a parliamentary constitutional monarchy was formed in 1859 as prescribed in its Constitution, as amended from time to time. Since the Federation of Australia in 1901, Queensland has been a State of Australia, with the Constitution of Australia regulating the relationships between all state and territory governments and the Australian Government. Under the Australian Constitution, all states and territories (including Queensland) ceded powers relating to certain matters to the federal government.

The government is influenced by the Westminster system and Australia's federal system of government. The Governor of Queensland, as the representative of Charles III, King of Australia, holds nominal executive power, although in practice only performs ceremonial duties. In practice executive power lies with the Premier and Cabinet. The Cabinet of Queensland is the government's chief policy-making organ, and consists of the Premier and all ministers.

Headquarters of all government agencies are located throughout the capital city of Brisbane, with most at 1 William Street, a purpose-built government skyscraper in the Brisbane CBD.

Government in Australia generally refers to the executive branch only and the overall governmental structure of Queensland including the legislative and judicial branches, as well as federal representation and ideology is dealt with in Politics of Queensland.

Executive and judicial powers
Queensland is governed according to the principles of the Westminster system, a form of parliamentary government based on the model of the United Kingdom. Legislative power rests with the Parliament of Queensland, which consists of the Crown, represented by the Governor of Queensland, and the one House, the Legislative Assembly of Queensland. Executive power rests formally with the Executive Council, which consists of the Governor and senior ministers.

The Governor, as representative of the Crown, is the formal repository of power, which is exercised by him or her on the advice of the Premier of Queensland and the Cabinet. The Premier and Ministers are appointed by the Governor, and hold office by virtue of their ability to command the support of a majority of members of the Legislative Assembly.  Judicial power is exercised by the Supreme Court of Queensland and a system of subordinate courts, but the High Court of Australia and other federal courts have overriding jurisdiction on matters which fall under the ambit of the Australian Constitution.

Current Ministry

Queensland Government departments

The Queensland Government delivers services, determines policy and regulations, including legal interpretation, by a number of agencies grouped under areas of portfolio responsibility. Each portfolio is led by a government minister who is a member of the Parliament.  there were 23 lead agencies, called government departments, that consist of:
 Department of the Premier and Cabinet
Queensland Treasury 
Department of Children, Youth Justice and Multicultural Affairs
 Department of Agriculture and Fisheries 
 Department of Education
Department of Employment, Small Business and Training
Department of Environment and Science
 Queensland Health
Department of Justice and Attorney-General
Department of Seniors, Disability Services and Aboriginal and Torres Strait Islander Partnerships
Department of State Development, Infrastructure, Local Government and Planning
Department of Transport and Main Roads
Department of Tourism, Innovation and Sport
Department of Resources
Department of Energy and Public Works
Department of Regional Development, Manufacturing and Water
Department of Communities, Housing and Digital Economy
Public Service Commission
Queensland Ambulance Service
Queensland Corrective Services
Queensland Police Service
Queensland Fire and Emergency Services

A range of other agencies support the functions of these departments.

See also

 Politics of Queensland
 Crime and Corruption Commission
 Women in the Queensland Legislative Assembly

References

External links 

 
 Queensland Constitution
 Queensland Parliament
 The Premier of Queensland